Ben Grass is a British Film producer and entrepreneur. He is the founder of film and television production company Pure Grass Films.

Early life and education 
Grass was educated at Dr Challoner's Grammar School; a selective grammar school for boys in Amersham, Buckinghamshire. He went on to study history at the University of Oxford in 1990. He received an MBA from INSEAD in 1997.

Career

Early career 
Following INSEAD, and a number of years as a management consultant, Grass became an advisor on corporate strategy at the BBC, before becoming Director of Internet and Wireless in Europe for Sony Pictures.

Later career and Pure Grass films 
Grass founded Pure Grass Films in May 2005 with his brother, Creative director Tom Grass. It initially focused on Digital entertainment series with spin-off potential for Television, Feature films and Games. Advisors to the company include the British Actor Damian Lewis, and chairman Christophe Charlier, the former Chairman of Renaissance Capital and the Brooklyn Nets (NBA Team).

In March 2008, Endemol Shine UK announced its acquisition of a 40% stake in Pure Grass Films, with the aims of expanding their digital presence.

Grass has produced a feature film, Twist, a modern re-imagining of Oliver Twist set in London. Raff Law, son of Jude Law was cast to play the titular Twist. Michael Caine was cast as Fagin, with Lena Headey and Rita Ora cast as female renditions of Bill Sikes and Artful Dodger, respectively. David Walliams, Franz Drameh and Sophie Simnett were also cast. The film was scheduled for a late 2020 release. Sky Cinema will distribute the film within the United Kingdom, with Saban Films distributing within North America. 

Grass is also developing a modern-day feature film version of the story of the Count of Monte Cristo, which he is producing with Bear Grylls, Delbert Schoopman and Christophe Charlier.

Filmography 
Grass's notable prior filmography credits include "Kirill" (which won a Webby and was nominated for a Digital Emmy) and "Beyond the Rave", which was Myspace’s first original series outside the US. Beyond the Rave, was an 20 part Horror series financed by Hammer Films – their first production in 25 years. The series starred Sadie Frost (Dracula), Jamie Dornan (Fifty Shades of Grey), Nora-Jane Noone (The Descent) and Tamer Hassan (Eastern Promises). Music was by Pete Tong. On 17 April 2008, the series was first released through MySpace TV, as their first international co-production, followed by a major international DVD release.

Other credits include When Evil Calls – the world's first horror series for mobile phones, which starred Sean Pertwee (Dog Soldiers), Dominique Pinon (Amelie, Delicatessen), and Chris Barrie (Red Dwarf).

References 

1971 births
Living people
British film producers